The Closed Circuit is a 2013 Polish action film directed by Ryszard Bugajski.

History 
The writers of The Closed Circuit, Michał Pruski and Mirosław Piepka, were inspired by the true story of businessmen struggling with the accusations made by the prosecutor's office and the tax office. Some of them ended up in mining arrest, and their company was brought to collapse. One of the cases against them was discontinued years later due to the lack of any signs of a crime, and entrepreneurs received 10,000 zlotys in compensation, while in the second, the court issued an invalid conviction at the end of 2013. Some of the accused were acquitted, and some pleaded guilty and voluntarily submitted to the punishment.

Plot 
Based on real events, the story of three owners of a thriving company, who – as a result of the collusion of corrupt officials: the prosecutor (Janusz Gajos) and the head of the tax office (Kazimierz Kaczor) – are showly detained on charges of acting in an organized criminal group and money laundering.

Cast 
 Janusz Gajos as Andrzej Kostrzewa
 Kazimierz Kaczor as Miroslaw Kaminski
 Wojciech Zoladkowicz as Kamil Slodowski
 Robert Olech as Piotr Maj
 Przemysław Sadowski as Marek Stawski
 Magdalena Kumorek as Dorota Maj

References

External links 

2013 action films
2013 films
Films directed by Ryszard Bugajski
Polish action films